The 2013 Independent Spirit Awards can refer to:

28th Independent Spirit Awards, a ceremony held in 2013, honoring the films of 2012
29th Independent Spirit Awards, a ceremony held in 2014, honoring the films of 2013

Independent Spirit Awards